Somewhere in Civvies is a 1943 British comedy film directed by Maclean Rogers and starring Frank Randle, George Doonan and Suzette Tarri. Private Randle is discharged from the army and finds it difficult to adjust to civilian life. It was followed in 1949 by  Somewhere in Politics.

Plot
Ex-army private Randle stands to receive a substantial inheritance from his uncle if he can prove he is of sound mind. However, his devious cousin tries to grab the money by having Randle committed to a psychiatric home.

Cast
 Frank Randle – Pte. Randle
 George Doonan – Sgt. Doonan
 Suzette Tarri – Mrs. Spam
 Joss Ambler – Matthews
 H.F. Maltby – Col. Tyldesley
 Nancy O'Neil – Mary Randle
 Grey Blake – Ralph Tyldesley
 Gus Aubrey – Pilkington

References

Bibliography
 Rattigan, Neil. This is England: British film and the People's War, 1939-1945. Associated University Presses, 2001.

External links

1943 films
1943 comedy films
Films directed by Maclean Rogers
British comedy films
Military humor in film
British black-and-white films
Films scored by Percival Mackey
1940s English-language films
1940s British films